The 13th Asian Table Tennis Championships 1996 were held in Osaka, Japan, from 4 to 10 December 1996. It was organised by the Singapore Table Tennis Association under the authority of Asian Table Tennis Union (ATTU) and International Table Tennis Federation (ITTF).

Medal summary

Medal table

Events

See also
World Table Tennis Championships
Asian Cup

References

Asian Table Tennis Championships
Asian Table Tennis Championships
Table Tennis Championships
Table tennis competitions in Singapore
Asian Table Tennis Championships
Asian Table Tennis Championships